Jinhua Park is a park in Lunpi Village, Datong Township, Yilan County, Taiwan.

Geology
The park is located along the Jiuiao River which its upstream is originated from Xueshan in Heping District, Taichung.

Architecture
The park features various facilities such as barbecue area and exhibitions, as well as 1.8 km long trail.

See also
 List of parks in Taiwan
 List of tourist attractions in Taiwan

References

Geography of Yilan County, Taiwan
Parks in Yilan County